Spiere Castle is a castle in Spiere, Belgium.

See also
List of castles in Belgium

External link

Castles in Belgium
Castles in West Flanders